The First Baptist Church, also known as the Bell Towers, is a historic church complex built in 1931 in Bakersfield, California and presently used as an office building.  The structure was placed on the National Register of Historic Places (NRHP) on January 2, 1979.

Structure
Constructed in 1931, the structure was built of reinforced concrete, with the outside finish, simulating brick, created by a poured cast.  Red, Spanish tile shingles cover the roof.  A prominent, 70 foot (21 meter) bell tower stands in the center of the south facade, forming part of what was the vestibule and narthex of the church.  The south side of the church also features large white oak doors with decorative arches above them.  Blind arches and mullions rise to the roof level, giving the structure its Romanesque character.  A single story arcade joins the wings of the building and surrounds a landscaped courtyard.

The southwest side of the complex is the original fellowship hall, built in a Mission Revival style.  The structure is characterized by lofty arched windows on its west side; on its south side is a large arched window, originally a door, flanked by smaller arched windows.  The old fellowship hall and church are connected by a two-story connecting building that continues the overall Mission Revival appearance.

Significance
Located on a prominent spot in downtown Bakersfield, the First Baptist Church structure is considered one of the finest examples of a decorative concrete structure in the San Joaquin Valley and is a prominent landmark in Bakersfield.  It is the only religious structure of its era to survive the 1952 Kern County earthquake that destroyed many of downtown Bakersfield's historic structures.  It is also one of the few buildings in the area to remain relatively unaltered over the ensuing years.

See also
 Bakersfield Register of Historic Places and Areas of Historic Interest
California Historical Landmarks in Kern County, California
National Register of Historic Places listings in Kern County, California

References

Churches in Kern County, California
Buildings and structures in Bakersfield, California
National Register of Historic Places in Kern County, California
Churches on the National Register of Historic Places in California
Churches completed in 1931
20th-century Baptist churches in the United States
Tourist attractions in Bakersfield, California
Mission Revival architecture in California
Romanesque Revival church buildings in California